Benzimidazole is a heterocyclic aromatic organic compound.  This bicyclic compound may be viewed as fused rings of the aromatic compounds benzene and imidazole. It is a white solid that appears in form of tabular crystals.

Preparation 
Benzimidazole is produced by condensation of o-phenylenediamine with formic acid,
C6H4(NH2)2  +  HC(OCH3)3  →  C6H4N(NH)CH  +  3 CH3OH

2-Substituted derivatives are obtained when the condensation is conducted with aldehydes in place of formic acid, followed by oxidation.

Reactions
Benzimidazole is a base:
C6H4N(NH)CH  +  H+  →  [C6H4(NH)2CH]+
It can also be deprotonated with stronger bases:
C6H4N(NH)CH  +  LiH  → Li [C6H4N2CH]  +  H2

The imine can be alkylated and also serves as a ligand in coordination chemistry.  The most prominent benzimidazole complex features N-ribosyl-dimethylbenzimidazole as found in vitamin B12.	

N,N'-Dialkylbenzimidazolium salts are precursors to certain N-heterocyclic carbenes.

Applications

Benzimidazole derivatives are among the most frequently used ring systems for small molecule drugs listed by the United States Food and Drug Administration. Many pharmaceutical agents belong to the benzimidazole class of compounds. For example:

 Angiotensin II receptor blockers such as azilsartan, candesartan, and telmisartan.
 Anthelmintic agents such as albendazole, ciclobendazole, fenbendazole, flubendazole, mebendazole, oxfendazole, oxibendazole, triclabendazole, and thiabendazole.
 Antihistamines such as astemizole, bilastine, clemizole, emedastine, mizolastine, and oxatomide.
 Benzimidazole fungicides such as benomyl, carbendazim, fuberidazole, and thiabendazole.
 Benzimidazole opioids such as bezitramide, brorphine, clonitazene, etodesnitazene, etonitazene, etonitazepipne, etonitazepyne, isotonitazene, metodesnitazene, and metonitazene.
 Proton-pump inhibitors such as dexlansoprazole, esomeprazole, ilaprazole, lansoprazole, omeprazole, pantoprazole, rabeprazole, and tenatoprazole.
 Typical antipsychotics such as benperidol, clopimozide, droperidol, neflumozide, and oxiperomide, and pimozide.
 Other notable pharmaceutical agents which contain a benzimidazole group include abemaciclib, bendamustine, dabigatran, daridorexant, and glasdegib.

In printed circuit board manufacturing, benzimidazole can be used as an organic solderability preservative.

Several dyes are derived from benzimidazoles.

See also 
 Benzimidazoline
 Polybenzimidazole, a high performance fiber

References

Further reading 

 
Aromatic bases
Simple aromatic rings